Ray Whitford (5 November 1889 – 12 January 1970) was an Australian rules footballer who played with University.

Sources
Holmesby, Russell & Main, Jim (2007). The Encyclopedia of AFL Footballers. 7th ed. Melbourne: Bas Publishing.

1889 births
1970 deaths
Australian rules footballers from Victoria (Australia)
University Football Club players